Greater Sylhet Development and Welfare Council in UK (often abbreviated as GSC) is a British voluntary charity for the welfare of Sylheti Bangladeshi people living in the United Kingdom.

Premise
Greater Sylhet Development and Welfare Council (GSC) in UK is a voluntary organisation established in 1993, representing Bangladeshis in the UK. It is a nationwide charity working for the welfare of British Bangladeshi people living in the UK who originate from the division of Sylhet, who make up 90% of Britain's 500,000 Bangladeshis.

The organisation is run by an elected National Executive Committee and is governed by a constitution. It has 13 regional committees working with the same charter of welfare for the Bangladeshi community living in various regions throughout the UK. It works towards helping and raising money for charitable causes

See also
British Bangladeshi
List of British Bangladeshis

References

External links

Organizations established in 1993
1993 establishments in England
Charities based in London
Social welfare charities based in the United Kingdom
Bangladeshi diaspora in the United Kingdom
Diaspora organisations based in London